Kug is a rural locality (a selo) in Khivsky District, Republic of Dagestan, Russia. The population was 863 as of 2010. There are 7 streets.

Geography 
Kug is located 13 km northeast of Khiv (the district's administrative centre) by road. Yargil is the nearest rural locality.

References 

Rural localities in Khivsky District